Cansu Özbay (born 17 October 1996) is a Turkish volleyball player. Currently, she plays for Vakıfbank Istanbul. She is a member of the Turkey women's national volleyball team.

Playing career

Club 
Cansu Özbay started her volleyball career in Göztepe than continued in the youth development team of Arkas Spor at her hometown in Izmir. She then transferred to the Istanbul-based club Beşiktaş .K. In January 2015, Özbay was loaned out from her club Beşiktaş JK to Nilüfer Belediyespor in Bursa, where she played the second half of the 2014–15 Turkish Women's Volleyball League season. At the end of the season, she returned to her relegated club to play in the 2015–16 Second League season. Her team finished the season as champion, and was promoted to the First League. For the 2016–17 League season, she was transferred by Vakıfbank Istanbul. She succeeded Naz Aydemir Akyol as setter in the team. She enjoyed her team's league champion title in the 2016–17 and 2017–18 League seasons. She was awarded the title of "Best Setter" of the 2017–18 season's final series.

Özbay participated at the 2016 FIVB Volleyball Women's Club World Championship held in  Metro Manila, Philippines, where her team Vakıfbank Istanbul placed third. The next year, her team became champion of the 2017 FIVB Volleyball Women's Club World Championship in Kobe, Japan.

International 
Özbay was part of the Turkey girls' U18 team at the 2013 CEV Youth Volleyball European Championship – Girls held in Serbia and at the 2013 FIVB Girls' U18 World Championship held in Thailand.

She was a member of the Turkey women's U20 team, and played at the 2015 FIVB Volleyball Women's U20 World Championship held in Puerto Rico.

She competed at the 2017 Women's European Volleyball Championship held in Azerbaijan and Georgia, where the Turkey women's team ranked third. She was part of the national team at the 2018 FIVB Volleyball Women's Nations League, which became silver medalist after losing to the United States in the final.

Honours

Club 
 Champions (7) 
 2015–16 Turkish Women's Second Volleyball League (Beşiktaş JK),
 2016–17 Turkish Women's Volleyball League (VakıfBank)
 2017 FIVB Volleyball Women's Club World Championship (VakıfBank)
 2017–18 Turkish Women's Volleyball League (VakıfBank)
 2021 FIVB Club World Championship  (VakıfBank)
 2021–22 Turkish Women's Volleyball League (VakıfBank)
 2021–22 CEV Women's Champions League  (VakıfBank)

 Third places (2)
 2016 FIVB Volleyball Women's Club World Championship (VakıfBank)
 2019 FIVB Club World Championship  (VakıfBank)

National team
 2017 European Championship -  Bronze Medal
 2018 Nations League -   Silver Medal
 2019 European Championship -  Silver Medal
 2021 Nations League -  Bronze Medal
 2021 European Championship -  Bronze Medal

Individual 
 Best Setter (2) 
 2017–18 Turkish Women's Volleyball League Final series (VakıfBank)
 2018 FIVB Nations League (Turkey National Team)
 Most Valuable Player (1) 
 2020 Turkish Super Cup Final series (VakıfBank)

References 

Living people
1996 births
Sportspeople from İzmir
Turkish women's volleyball players
Beşiktaş volleyballers
Nilüfer Belediyespor volleyballers
VakıfBank S.K. volleyballers
Turkey women's international volleyball players
Volleyball players at the 2020 Summer Olympics
Olympic volleyball players of Turkey
Setters (volleyball)